Chad Van Sickle (born August 23, 1977) is an American professional boxer. He is a former NABA Cruiserweight Champion and former WBC Americas Champion. His manager is Scott Walisa, and he is trained by his father Bob Van Sickle.

Van Sickle was born in Columbus and began boxing at a teenager, being trained by his father Rob Van Sickle and 1984 Olympic Gold Medalist Jerry Page.

Van Sickle did run a boxing gym in Columbus, Ohio, which is called Team VanSickle 12 Round Boxing. This gym opened up after he ran a gym at the Westland Mall (Columbus) with another professional boxer named Leo Martinez. He now trains fighters at Skrap House MMA in Grove City, Ohio, just south of Columbus, Ohio.

References

Chad Van Sickle at BoxRec Wiki

1977 births
Living people
Boxers from Columbus, Ohio
American male boxers
Heavyweight boxers